Pearl Django is a jazz group established in 1994 in Tacoma, Washington by guitarists Neil Andersson and Dudley Hill and bassist David "Pope" Firman. The group melds the music of Django Reinhardt and Stephane Grappelli with American Swing. Initially a trio, they have changed and added members over the years and are now a quintet. Based in Seattle, they have played around the United States, as well as in France and Iceland.

The band has performed at the prestigious Festival Django Reinhardt in Samois-sur-Seine and at Juan de Fuca Festival. They have played with Martin Taylor, Bucky Pizzarelli, and Gail Pettis, a two-time recipient of the Earshot Jazz 'Jazz Vocalist Of The Year' award. The British virtuoso Taylor turns up on three tracks of their 2011 album Eleven. On their twelfth album, Time Flies, released in 2015, all tracks are their own compositions except for one classic bossa nova.

Discography

References

External links
 Official website
 Pearl Django at AllMusic

Jazz fusion ensembles
Gypsy jazz musicians
Swing ensembles
Swing revival ensembles
American jazz ensembles from Washington (state)
Music of Seattle

Jazz musicians from Washington (state)